The RWD 6 was a Polish sports plane of 1932, constructed by the RWD team. It was a winner of the Challenge 1932 international tourist aircraft contest.

Development
The aircraft was designed specially for the purpose of competing in the international tourist aircraft contest Challenge, which RWD attended in 1930, without major success. It was constructed by the RWD team of Stanislaw Rogalski, Stanislaw Wigura and Jerzy Drzewiecki in the workshops of Students' Mechanical Club of Warsaw University of Technology (their designs were named RWD after their initial letters). The new plane differed from previous RWD designs, having a cab with two seats next to each other, folding wings and good wing mechanization (slats and flaps).

Only three aircraft were built, the first one was flown on June 3, 1932 by its designer Jerzy Drzewiecki. The aircraft were given civilian registrations SP-AHL, SP-AHM and SP-AHN. During trials, SP-AHM crashed and Drzewiecki was hurt. After some modification of the tail, the two remaining RWD 6s were sent to the Challenge contest.

Challenge 1932, held between August 11–28, 1932, was eventually won by Franciszek Żwirko (pilot) and Stanisław Wigura (mechanic) in their RWD 6 SP-AHN, with a start number O6. The other RWD 6, flown by Tadeusz Karpiński, took ninth place out of 43 competitors (SP-AHL, nr. O4). During contest, the RWD 6 was given the highest scores for technical evaluation of all participating aircraft.

On September 11, 1932, the RWD 6 SP-AHN with Franciszek Żwirko and Stanisław Wigura aboard, crashed during a storm while flying to an air meeting in Czechoslovakia. Both died. The cause was found to be weak wing mountings, that caused wing warping at higher speeds. The last remaining RWD 6 (SP-AHL) was modified after this accident, receiving a strengthened wing with V-shaped struts and the new designation RWD 6bis. The RWD 6bis was completed and flown in September 1933. In 1935 it was broken up, and its fuselage was used to create the RWD 13 touring plane prototype. A direct development of the RWD 6 as a sport plane was a four-seater RWD 9, a winner of the Challenge 1934.

Description
Two-seater sports and touring strutted high-wing monoplane of a mixed construction. A metal frame fuselage covered with canvas, with the engine clad in  aluminium sheets. Rectangular single-spar wing of wooden construction, canvas and plywood covered. Wings folded rearwards, and were equipped with automatic slats and flaps. Closed cabin with two seats side-by-side, with dual controls. The cabin had a pair of doors. 7-cylinder Armstrong Siddeley Genet Major radial engine of 104 kW (140 hp) (119 kW, 160 hp start power). Two-blade metal propeller. Conventional landing gear, with a rear skid. Fuel tanks in wings (140 L, 34 US gal). Take-off: 111 m (to altitude 8 m), landing: 106 m (from altitude 8 m – best results from the Challenge contest).

Specifications

See also

References

Further reading

RWD 06
RWD 06
Single-engined tractor aircraft
High-wing aircraft
Aircraft first flown in 1932